Fred Gibson (born 16 January 1941) is a former Australian racing driver and race team owner.

Career

After a career that began in small production sports cars, first an MGA, and later the first Lotus Elan to run in Australian competition, Gibson quickly moved up into the touring car ranks. In just his second Bathurst start he claimed second place in the 1966 Gallaher 500.

In 1967, Frank Matich, who was to co-drive one of the new Ford XR Falcon GTs at Bathurst with Harry Firth, had to pull out due to other commitments, and recommended Gibson as his replacement. Gibson first met Firth on the Thursday before the Gallaher 500 and later set the second fastest qualifying time behind their Sydney based teammates Ian and Leo Geoghegan, 1967 was the first year at Bathurst that grid positions were determined by qualifying times and not by class.

Alongside his team boss, Gibson scored his first major win, defeating the Geoghegans after a re-count of laps (the Geoghegans were flagged in 1st but a lap scoring error had been made during their first pit stop). The leading V8 Falcon GT's battled for most of the race with the Alfa Romeo 1600 GTVs, but for the first time in the history of the race, the bigger cars proved up to the challenge and went on to a strong win over the leading GTV of Doug Chivas and Max Stewart.

Gibson became a mainstay with the Ford Works Team for the next six years, taking much success at Sydney's Oran Park and Amaroo Park in particular. He won the competitive Oran Park production sedan series, the Toby Lee Series, in 1970 and 1971 driving his Falcon GTHO supported by his Sydney speedshop, Road & Track. At Bathurst however in the early 1970s he suffered a string of retirements. When the racing industry went into decline during the 70s Gibson raced less frequently but was a still regular at Bathurst.

In 1981 Gibson joined the newly formed Nissan touring car team, headed by his former Ford Australia boss Howard Marsden. Gibson became the team's regular number two driver alongside George Fury driving the Group C Nissan Bluebird Turbo, pioneering turbo charged touring cars in Australia. Gibson's racing involvement generally was as lead driver of the team's second car at the Sandown and Bathurst enduros, selected Australian Touring Car Championship races and at the AMSCAR series at Amaroo Park.

Fred Gibson gave Nissan its first touring car race win in Australia (and the first turbocharged win in Australian touring car racing) when he won heats 2 and 3 of Round 3 of the 1983 AMSCAR series. After finishing 2nd in heat 1, Gibson won the round, going on to eventually finish 3rd in the series final pointscore.

Gibson's win in the AMSCAR round was his first major touring car win since he drove the Ford team's new XA Falcon Hardtop to win the Chesterfield 250 at the Adelaide International Raceway in 1973, giving him the distinction of being the first winner in both the Falcon Hardtop and the turbocharged Bluebird. His 1983 AMSCAR win would also prove to be the last win of Gibson's driving career.

During the early 1980s Gibson's Road & Track business also built Group C Ford Falcons for Sydney privateer Joe Moore. The Ford XD Falcon built by Gibson and raced by Moore at the 1981 James Hardie 1000 was co-driven by Fred Gibson's wife Christine.

Team Owner/Manager
Gibson retired from driving after 1983 and replaced Marsden as Nissan team boss at the end of 1984, overseeing the introduction of the turbocharged Nissan Skyline DR30 in 1986. Highlights included winning the Australia Touring Car Championship in 1990 and 1991 with Jim Richards and 1992 series with Mark Skaife. Richards and Skaife won the 1991 and 1992 Bathurst 1000s.

With Nissan being forced out by the new for 1993 V8 formula, Gibson Motorsport switched to Holden Commodores with Skaife winning the 1994 series. The team would go through a down period following the banning of tobacco sponsorship at the end of 1995, running only a limited program in 1997. The team returned to full-time competition in 1998 with Steven Richards and Greg Murphy winning the 1999 Bathurst 1000. At the end of 1999, Gibson sold the team to Garry Dumbrell.

In 2001, Gibson returned as the public face of Gibson Motorsport. Although initially portrayed as Gibson buying back his own team, it later emerged that it was Bob Forbes and not Fred Gibson who had bought the team, with Gibson only have purchased the franchise. A falling-out between Forbes and Gibson saw the latter leave the team after Bathurst. As Forbes owned his own franchise, Gibson sold his to Briggs Motor Sport. After leaving the team, Gibson retained ownership of the team's Dandenong workshop. It was later leased to Paul Weel Racing and today is Garry Rogers Motorsport's base.

In 2004 Gibson was inducted into the V8 Supercars Hall of Fame. In 2013, Gibson reformed Gibson Motorsport with Alan Heaphy as a race car preparer for cars participating in the Heritage Touring Cars series. Amongst its clients are the owners of former Gibson Motorsport Nissans.

Personal life
In the mid-1970s, Gibson married to fellow former racing driver, Christine Gibson (née Cole); herself a successful racer, the couple have two daughters.

Career results

Complete Australian Touring Car Championship results
(key) (Races in bold indicate pole position) (Races in italics indicate fastest lap)

Complete Bathurst 500/1000 results

References

External links
Driver Database stats
Episode 4: Shannons Legends of Motorsport

Australian racing drivers
Australian Touring Car Championship drivers
Bathurst 1000 winners
Living people
Tasman Series drivers
1941 births
Australian Endurance Championship drivers